Quinquina is an aromatised wine, a variety of apéritif. Traditionally quinquinas contain cinchona bark, which provides quinine. Quinine was used in treating malaria.

Americano is considered either a subclass of quinquina, or a separate variety of apéritif. Americano uses gentian root as the primary ingredient for flavoring and bitterness.

Quinquina also refers to Peruvian bark, which originates from South America. It was introduced to Europe in the 17th century by Spanish missionaries.

Some quinquinas are:
 Bonal Gentiane Quina
 Byrrh
 Cocchi Americano
 Contratto Americano Rosso
 Dubonnet
 Lillet Blanc
 Mattei Cap Corse Quinquina Blanc and Rouge
 MAiDENii
 St. Raphaël
 Alma de Trabanco- Quinquina en Rama

References

Aromatised wine
Quinine